Patrick Daley (1844–1914) was a 19th-century Australian bushranger. Patrick Daley may also refer to:

Patrick R. Daley (born 1975), American businessman and son of former Chicago mayor Richard Daley
Pat Daley (born 1959), ice hockey player

See also
Patrick Daly (fl. 1930s–1940s), Irish politician, vintner and farmer
P. T. Daly (1870–1943), Irish trade unionist and politician